Wallace Statue may refer to the following monuments in Scotland:

 Wallace Monument, Stirling, which has at its corner a statue of Wallace
 Statue of William Wallace, Aberdeen
 Statue of William Wallace, Bemersyde

See also
 William Wallace
 National Monument of Scotland, Edinburgh
 Wallace's Monument, Ayrshire
 William Wallace Monument at Elderslie